Carlos Montemayor (June 13, 1947 in Parral, Chihuahua – February 28, 2010 in Mexico City) was a Mexican novelist, poet, essayist, literary critic, tenor, political analyst, and promoter of contemporary literature written in indigenous languages. He was a Member of the Mexican Academy of the Language.

Montemayor died of stomach cancer on February 28, 2010.

Awards and honors
1990 José Fuentes Mares National Prize for Literature

Works

Novel
Mal de piedra (Blood relations, 1980)
Minas del retorno (Gambusino, 1982)
Guerra en el paraíso (1997)
Los informes secretos (1999)
Las armas del alba (2003)
La fuga (2007)

Narrative
Las llaves de Urgell (1971)
El alba y otros cuentos (1986)
Operativo en el trópico (1994)
Cuentos gnósticos (1997)
La tormenta y otras historias (1999)

Poetry
Las armas del viento (1977)
Abril y otros poemas (1979)
Finisterra (Finisterra and other poems, 1982)
Abril y otras estaciones (1989)
Poesía (1977-1996) (1997)
Antología personal (2001)
Apuntes del exilio (2010)

References

External links
 Carlos Montemayor's profile, Instituto Nacional de Bellas Artes
Report of death (El Universal)

1947 births
2010 deaths
Deaths from cancer in Mexico
Deaths from stomach cancer
Members of the Mexican Academy of Language
Mexican translators
Writers from Chihuahua
20th-century translators
20th-century Mexican male writers